Alfredo Panzini (31 December 1863 – 10 April 1939) was an Italian novelist and lexicographer.

Born in Senigallia, Panzini was a student of Giosuè Carducci at the University of Bologna. Panzini worked as a secondary school teacher before becoming a writer. Panzini is noted for the humorous and often genial tone of his writings. Among his many works, there are Libro dei Morti (1893), Santippe (1914), and Il diavolo nella mia libreria (1920).
 
The idiosyncratic Italian dictionary he authored, Dizionario moderno, covered all forms of the language including slang. It was printed in several editions.

Panzini also penned several historical works, and in 1929 was among the first members of the Royal Academy of Italy named by Mussolini.  He died at the age of 75.

In translation
 Wanted—a Wife (Io cerco moglie!), authorized translation by Frederic Taber Cooper, New York, N.L. Brown, 1922, 294 p.
 Novelle, The University of Chicago press, 1934
 The affairs of the major (Le vicende del maggiore), The Holerth press, 19?

References

Further reading

External links
 
 
 

1863 births
1939 deaths
People from Senigallia
Italian male non-fiction writers
Italian lexicographers
Members of the Royal Academy of Italy